The 1914 Southern Intercollegiate Athletic Association football season was the college football games played by the member schools of the Southern Intercollegiate Athletic Association as part of the 1914 college football season. The season began on September 26.

Tennessee and Auburn both claim conference championships. It was the first championship of any kind for the Tennessee program. Vanderbilt no longer dominated the South by 1914.

Regular season

SIAA teams in bold.

Week One

Week Two

Week Three

Week Four

Week Five

Week Six

Week Seven

Week Eight

Week Nine

Week Ten

Week Eleven

Awards and honors

All-Americans

QB - David Paddock, Georgia (PHD)

All-Southern team

The composite All-Southern team compiled from a total of seven sports writers, coaches, and others by Z. G. Clevenger, University of Tennessee athletic director included:

References